Anelasma is a monotypic genus of goose barnacles that live as parasites on various shark hosts.

Taxonomy
The genus Anelasma contains a single species, Anelasma squalicola. The nominal species, however, has a very broad distribution and may in fact be a species complex that contain several undescribed species.

It has been suggested that Anelasma diverged from the ancestor it shares with its current closest relatives (the free-living, suspension-feeding species in the genera Capitulum and Pollicipes) a long time ago. The species may represent the only remaining representative of a previously more numerous clade that made the evolutionary transition from filter-feeding to parasitism.

Description

This barnacle reaches a length of approximately 25 mm. Unlike most barnacles, it has no shell; the outermost integument is its tough, purplish-black mantle, without any calcareous plates. The body protrudes from the skin of its host and is usually encountered in pairs. The cirri, normally used by barnacles for filtering food items out of the water, are vestigial, being small and unbranched, and have lost their feeding function. Nutrition is instead extracted from the host through hidden tendrils that extend downwards from the base.

Distribution
The species is widespread in deeper waters (samples off South Africa have been obtained from ~650 m) and occurs on a variety of shark species. Records are known from cold waters off Greenland, Britain, New Zealand, Chile and South Africa, as well as warmer waters off Spain, the Canary Islands, Australia, and in the Gulf of Mexico.

Ecology
Anelasma are mesoparasitic barnacles that can be found attached to several species of deep-sea squaloid sharks, including at least black dogfish (Centroscyllium fabricii), combtooth dogfish (Centroscyllium nigrum), velvet belly lanternshark (Etmopterus spinax), fringefin lanternshark (E. schultzi), great lanternshark (E. princeps), brown lanternshark (E. unicolor), and southern lanternshark (E. granulosus). Anelasma are partially embedded in the flesh of the host, and seem to retard sexual development of their hosts, apparently castrating them.

References 
http://marinespecies.org/aphia.php?p=taxdetails&id=106093

External links 
 

Barnacles
Monotypic crustacean genera
Parasitic crustaceans
Taxa named by Charles Darwin